The Shetucket River is a tributary of the Thames River,  long, in eastern Connecticut in the United States.

It is formed at Willimantic by the junction of the Willimantic and Natchaug rivers. It flows southeast and south.

The river flows through a rural section of New England, despite the historical presence of industry in the surrounding region. Parts of the rivers have been designated by the federal government as the Quinebaug and Shetucket Rivers Valley National Heritage Corridor. The National Park Service describes the river valley as the "last green valley" in the Boston-to-Washington megalopolis. In nighttime satellite photos, the valley appears distinctively dark amidst the lights of the surrounding urban and suburban regions.

Crossings

Paddling the River
The entire length of the river, as well as the lower part of the Natchaug River flowing into it, is a popular recreational paddling route.

Canoe/Kayak launch sites are located at the following locations:
Lauter Park off Route 195 - Willimantic (on Natchaug River 1 mile above Shetucket River)
Recreation Park on Plains Road - Windham
Baltic Riverside Park on Route 97 - Sprague
Occum Dam canoe portage - Sprague
Lisbon Canoe Launch off Route 169 - Lisbon
Greenville Dam canoe portage - Norwich
Howard Brown Park - Norwich

Short, marked portages are required at four hydroelectric dams: Scotland Dam, Occum Dam, Taftville Dam, and Greenville Dam.

See also
List of Connecticut rivers

References

External links
National Park Service: Quinebaug and Shetucket Rivers Valley National Heritage Corridor
LastGreenValley.org
Connecticut Explorer's Guide Online Shetucket River maps

Rivers of Windham County, Connecticut
Rivers of New London County, Connecticut
Rivers of Connecticut
Connecticut placenames of Native American origin
Tributaries of the Thames River (Connecticut)